Mi hermana la nena is a Mexican telenovela produced by Valentín Pimstein for Televisión Independiente de México in 1976.

Cast 
Saby Kamalich as Silvia Guzmán / Geny Grimaldi
Jorge Lavat as Jorge
Raúl Ramírez as Guillermo
Blanca Sánchez as Regina
Yolanda Merida as Paulina "La Nena"
Lorenzo de Rodas as Dr.Castro
Rocío Banquells as Mónica
Juan Antonio Edwards as Julio
Barbara Gil as María
Roxana Saucedo as Luisita
Estella Chacón as Estela
Graciela Orozco as Catalina
Ricardo Corte as Dick
Salvador Julian as José Antonio

References

External links 

Mexican telenovelas
1976 telenovelas
Televisa telenovelas
Spanish-language telenovelas
1976 Mexican television series debuts
1976 Mexican television series endings